Andrew Walmsley (born September 1966) is a British-born production designer.

Career
Walmsley was initially involved in the theatre industry. He designed sets for several musicals, including Buddy: The Buddy Holly Story and Blood Brothers. Later, he moved into television set design, developing the set for Who Wants to Be a Millionaire?, So You Think You Can Dance, and America's Got Talent.

Walmsley has been nominated for three Emmy Awards in the category of Outstanding Art Direction, and won one for his work on American Idol.

Walmsley also works as a theatrical producer in Las Vegas, Nevada producing shows in casinos.

References

External links
 Website.
 .
 Interview at SketchUpdate.

Living people
1966 births
British film designers